Nirmala is a 1948 Indian Malayalam-language drama film directed by P. V. Krishna Iyer and produced by P. J. Cherian. The fourth talkie in Malayalam, Nirmala introduced playback singing to Malayalam cinema.

Cast
Cherian's family played a large part in the film. His son Joseph Cherian was cast as hero; Joseph's wife, Baby, was the heroine; and his daughters other relatives were part of this film.
 Joseph Cherian
 Baby Joseph
 P.K. Raghavan
 Cherthala Vasudeva Kurup
 P. J. Cherian
 Mathappan
 S. J. Dev
 Kamalamma

Music
The songs were composed by saxophone player P. S. Divakar and E. I. Warrier. Lyrics were by poet G. Sankara Kurup. There were 15 songs in the film, sung by P. Leela, P. K. Raghavan, Sarojini Menon, T. K. Govindarao, Vasudeva Kurup and Vimala B Varma. Govinda Rao and Sarojini Menon, who sang in this film, became the first male and female playback singers in Malayalam.

References

1940s Malayalam-language films
Indian black-and-white films